The Second Battle of Bud Dajo was a counterinsurgency action fought by American soldiers against native Moros in December 1911, during the Moro Rebellion phase of the Philippine–American War.

On November 11, 1909, Major General John J. Pershing assumed his duties as governor of the Moro province. On September 8, 1911, he issued Executive Order No. 24, which ordered the complete disarmament of all Moros. American soldiers experienced juramentado and amok attacks from Moros opposed to American rule. Pershing saw total disarmament as the solution to maintain American rule. The deadline for disarmament was December 1, 1911.

The attempted enforcement of this order brought about the Second Battle of Bud Dajo. In December 1911, an estimated 800 Moros fortified the top of the dormant volcano, a sacred site for refuge. Pershing, realizing the Moros had not time to provision their fortress, used two infantry battalions, a machine gun platoon, six troops of the 2nd Cavalry, a field artillery battery, five companies of the Philippine Scouts, and a company of Moro Constabulary.
Pershing, through negotiations, succeeded in persuading the majority of the assembled Moros to return home.

See also
 First Battle of Bud Dajo

References

Bud Dajo
1911 in the Philippines
Moro Rebellion
Bud Dajo 02
Bud Dajo
Bud Dajo, Second Battle
December 1911 events